Aleksandr Konstantinovich Bokiy (born 3 May 1957) is a Belarusian professional football coach and a former player.

Bokiy was born in Lida, Belarusian SSR.

Honours
 Soviet Top League champion: 1987, 1989.

European club competitions
 UEFA Cup 1987–88 with FC Spartak Moscow: 4 games.
 UEFA Cup 1989–90 with FC Spartak Moscow: 2 games.
 UEFA Cup 1991–92 with SK Sigma Olomouc: 1 game.

External links

1957 births
Living people
People from Lida
Soviet footballers
Belarusian footballers
Soviet expatriate footballers
Belarusian expatriate footballers
Expatriate footballers in the Czech Republic
Expatriate footballers in Czechoslovakia
Soviet Top League players
FC Neman Grodno players
FC Dynamo Stavropol players
FC Dynamo Moscow players
FC Lokomotiv Moscow players
FC Spartak Moscow players
SK Sigma Olomouc players
Belarusian football managers
Soviet expatriate sportspeople in Czechoslovakia
Belarusian expatriate football managers
Expatriate football managers in Czechoslovakia
Expatriate football managers in the Czech Republic
Association football defenders
Sportspeople from Grodno Region